Juma Ikangaa (born 19 July 1957 in Dodoma) is a marathon runner from Tanzania, who won the 1989 New York City Marathon in a course-record time of 2:08:01. Ikangaa was also a sentimental favorite in Boston Marathon after finishing second three years in a row at 
the Boston Marathon from 1988-1990.  A great trainer, Ikangaa said "The will to win means nothing without the will to prepare."

International competitions

Road races

References

External links

1957 births
Living people
People from Dodoma
Tanzanian male long-distance runners
Tanzanian male marathon runners
Olympic athletes of Tanzania
Athletes (track and field) at the 1984 Summer Olympics
Athletes (track and field) at the 1988 Summer Olympics
Athletes (track and field) at the 1992 Summer Olympics
Commonwealth Games silver medallists for Tanzania
Commonwealth Games medallists in athletics
Athletes (track and field) at the 1982 Commonwealth Games
Athletes (track and field) at the 1990 Commonwealth Games
World Athletics Championships athletes for Tanzania
New York City Marathon male winners
Medallists at the 1982 Commonwealth Games